The Southern Indiana Career & Technical Center is a high school-level institution that provides advanced education to meet the demand in the areas of agriculture, business and marketing, family and consumer sciences, health careers, and trade and industry arts to the students in Indiana's Area Career & Technical District #46 (ACTD-46) consisting of nine school district and corporations in Gibson, Posey, Spencer, Vanderburgh and Warrick Counties in Southwestern Indiana. 90.7 FM WPSR, which used to broadcast from Central High School, now broadcasts from the center.

To provide easier access to these services to the Evansville Vanderburgh School Corporation along with the other eight districts the facility was constructed outside the city of Evansville. Prior to 2004 students interested in these courses had to go to North High School on Diamond Avenue which was constantly plagued with road construction and traffic tie-ups in addition to cramped and non-airconditioned spaces. In terms of enrollment, the EVSC has one of the largest CTE programs in the State of Indiana.  Other than the EVSC the Southern Indiana Career and Technical Center draws Students from the following School Districts in Southwestern Indiana.

Gibson County
 East Gibson
 North Gibson
 South Gibson

Posey County
 MSD of Mt. Vernon
 MSD of North Posey

Spencer County
 South Spencer

Warrick County
 Warrick County

The new facility is located on Lynch Road just east of U.S. 41.

Resources
 The Southern Indiana Career and Technical Center

References

   

High schools in Southwestern Indiana
Vocational & technical high schools in Indiana
Public high schools in Indiana
Education in Gibson County, Indiana
Education in Posey County, Indiana
Education in Spencer County, Indiana
Education in Vanderburgh County, Indiana
Education in Warrick County, Indiana
Schools in Evansville, Indiana
Magnet schools in Indiana
2007 establishments in Indiana